Good Reading is a popular monthly print magazine, focused on books and reading, based in Australia. The magazine was launched in July 2001. The magazine is devoted to books and reading, and includes profiles of authors, extracts and independent reviews of the latest Australian and international releases across a wide range of adult, young-adult and children's fiction and non-fiction genres, and information on book-related events around Australia.

The print magazine featured more than 1,000 author interviews since its inception. High-profile and bestselling international authors who were interviewed and featured include Maeve Binchy, Wilbur Smith, Michael Ondaatje, Sir David Attenborough, Alexander McCall Smith, Amitav Ghosh, Sebastian Faulks, Linwood Barclay, and Joanna Trollope.

Good Reading magazine officially completed 10 years of print and online circulation on 1 July 2011, and in 2016 launched an online Reading Hub on which people can write reviews, read the magazine online and purchase books.

See also

References

External links
 Official site

2001 establishments in Australia
2011 disestablishments in Australia
Monthly magazines published in Australia
Book review magazines
Defunct literary magazines published in Australia
Magazines established in 2001
Magazines disestablished in 2011